Senator Flagg may refer to:

Norman G. Flagg (1867–1948), Illinois State Senate
Willard Cutting Flagg (1829–1878), Illinois State Senate